Brushstroke is a sculpture by Roy Lichtenstein. There are two copies. The original was created in 2001 for the Museo Nacional Centro de Arte Reina Sofía in Madrid, Spain. The second was delivered to the Hirshhorn Museum and Sculpture Garden in Washington, DC, on September 16, 2003, and dedicated on October 25, 2003.

See also
 1996 in art
 List of public art in Washington, D.C., Ward 2

References

External links
Brushstroke, 1996, Roy Lichtenstein Foundation
https://web.archive.org/web/20110722092615/http://www.lichtensteinfoundation.org/hirshorn07.htm
http://voices.washingtonpost.com/goingoutgurus/2009/07/july_4th_beer_garden_at_the_hi.html

Sculptures by Roy Lichtenstein
1996 sculptures
Hirshhorn Museum and Sculpture Garden
Sculptures of the Smithsonian Institution
Abstract sculptures in Washington, D.C.
Aluminum sculptures in Washington, D.C.
Outdoor sculptures in Washington, D.C.
Sculptures in Madrid